A proconsul was an official of ancient Rome who acted on behalf of a consul. A proconsul was typically a former consul. The term is also used in recent history for officials with delegated authority.

In the Roman Republic, military command, or imperium, could be exercised constitutionally only by a consul. There were two consuls at a time, each elected to a one-year term. They could not normally serve two terms in a row. If a military campaign was in progress at the end of a consul's term, the consul in command might have his command prorogued, allowing him to continue in command. This custom allowed for continuity of command despite the high turnover of consuls. In the Roman Empire, proconsul was a title held by a civil governor and did not imply military command.

In modern times, various officials with notable delegated authority have been referred to as proconsuls. Studies of leadership typically divide leaders into policymakers and subordinate administrators. The proconsul occupies a position between these two categories. Max Weber classified leadership as traditional, rational-legal (bureaucratic), and charismatic. A proconsul could be both a rule-following bureaucrat and charismatic personality. The rise of bureaucracy and rapid communication has reduced the scope for proconsular freelancing.

Etymology

The Latin word prōconsul is a shortened form of prō consule, meaning "(one acting) on behalf of the consul." It appears on inscriptions beginning in 135 BC. Ancient historians describe Quintus Publilius Philo, the first proconsul, as acting prō consule for 326 BC. For later proconsuls, the same sources use the shortened form.

Roman Republic
A proconsul was endowed with full consular authority outside the city of Rome. Cicero notes that this did not include the right to consult auguries: "Our ancestors would not undertake any military enterprise without consulting the auspices; but now, for many years, our wars have been conducted by pro-consuls and propraetors, who do not have the right to take auspices."

The position was created to deal with a constitutional peculiarity of the Roman Republic. Only a consul could command an army, but the high turnover of consuls could disrupt continuity of command. If a consul's term ended in the midst of a campaign, he could be prorogued and continue to command.

Quintus Publilius Philo was one of two consuls for the year 327 BC. When his term expired at the end of the year, his army was in the midst of besieging the city of Neapolis (modern Naples). Rather than risk a change of command at such a delicate moment, the people voted that he should "conduct the campaign in place of a consul (prō consule)" after his term expired. Publilius thus became the first proconsul.

With territorial expansion beyond Italy and the annexation of territories as Roman provinces, the proconsul became one of two types of Roman provincial governors. The other was the propraetor.

In theory, proconsuls held delegated authority and acted on behalf of the consuls. In practice, a proconsulship was often treated as an extension of a consul's term. This extension applied only outside the city walls of Rome. It was an extension of the military command of the consul, but not of his public office.

As the number of Roman legions was increased, there was a need to increase the number of military commanders. The office of the praetor was introduced in 366 BC. The praetors were the chief justices of the city. They were also given imperium so that they could also command an army.

During the Second Samnite War, Rome increased the number of her legions. The position of propraetor was instituted. These were praetors whose imperium was extended and were given the task to command a reserve army. Propraetors had the power to command one army, whereas proconsuls had the power to command two armies.

In 307 BC, Quintus Fabius Maximus Rullianus, who was consul the previous year, was elected as proconsul to conduct the campaign in Samnium. During the Third Samnite War (298–290 BC) the consuls of the previous year, Quintus Fabius Maximus Rullianus and Publius Decius Mus, were given a six-month extension of their authority to carry on the war in Samnium. In 291 BC Quintus Fabius Maximus Gurges had his command extended and to carry out mop up operations towards the end of the war. He defeated the Pentri, the largest Samnite tribe.

There were two republican proconsuls who did not previously hold the position of consul. During the Second Punic War (218–201 BC) Scipio Africanus volunteered to lead the second Roman expedition against the Carthaginians in Spain. He was too young to have been a consul. He was made proconsul by a vote of the Popular Assembly. When Scipio left Spain after his victory in 205 BC, Lucius Cornelius Lentulus and Lucius Manlius Acidinus were sent as commanders without public office (sine magistratus). This was done because Manlius Acidinus had not been a consul before.

As Rome acquired territory, the need for provincial governors grew. The province of Sicily was created in 241 BC, while Corsica and Sardinia was created in 238 BC. In 227 BC, two praetors were assigned the administration of these two provinces. Two more praetors were added when the provinces of Hispania Citerior and Hispania Ulterior were created in 197 BC. After this, no praetors were added even when the number of provinces increased. It became customary to extend the authority of consuls and the praetors at the end of their annual terms. The provinces were assigned by lot to proconsuls and propraetors. The proconsuls were assigned the provinces which contained the larger number of troops.

Under Lex Sempronia, enacted in 123 BC, the senate determined the allocation of the provinces before the next consular elections. In 81 BC, Sulla added two praetors so that the two proconsuls and six propraetors could be assigned to govern the ten provinces Rome ruled at that time. Sulla made the governorships annual and required the holder to leave the province within thirty days after the arrival of his successor.

In 67 BC, Pompey received extraordinary powers and an unprecedented multiyear proconsulship to deal with the problem of piracy. The "first triumvirate" of Julius Caesar, Pompey and Crassus also received multiyear proconsulships in 59 BC. Marcus Aemilius Lepidus (triumvir) was also granted this power in 38 BC.

Roman Empire
Under the Republic, consuls and proconsuls had raised and commanded armies loyal to themselves. Augustus, Rome's first emperor, replaced these essentially private armies with a standing imperial army. The consuls and proconsuls lost their military authority, but the titles retained considerable prestige.

The provinces were divided between imperial provinces, which were under the jurisdiction of the emperor, and senatorial provinces, which were under the jurisdiction of the senate. The imperial provinces were mostly the border provinces, where most of the legions were stationed. This allowed the emperor to retain control of the army. In the senatorial provinces, the governors were called proconsuls. Tenure was generally restricted to one year.

According to Suetonius:

Augustus decreed that the governors of the senatorial provinces would receive the title proconsul, regardless of whether they had served as praetor or consul. These were chosen by lot, with the result ratified by the Senate. In the imperial provinces, the emperors appointed governors who held the title of legatus Augusti pro praetore, or pro-praetor, regardless of what position they had held previously.

A passage in the New Testament notes that cases might be judged by a proconsul: "If therefore Demetrius and the artisans with him have a complaint against anyone, the courts are open, and there are proconsuls; let them bring charges there against one another."

Notitia Dignitatum, an early fifth-century imperial chancery document, mentions three proconsuls but no propraetors. These outranked vicars in precedence, though administratively they were subordinates like all governors. They governed the provinces of: Asia, comprising the central part of the western Anatolian coast; Achaea, comprising the Peloponnese and most of Central Greece; and Africa, the northern part of modern Tunisia.

In leadership theory
Although "proconsul" is an official title only with respect to magistrates of ancient Rome, the word has also been applied to various British, U.S., and French officials. In the modern context, it is rarely a compliment. The terms satrap (from Persian) and viceroy (from French) are both used in a similar way.

Despite the gulf between ancient and modern proconsuls, writer Carnes Lord has proposed a single definition to allow the phenomenon to be analyzed in the context of leadership theory: "delegated political-military leadership that rises in the best case to statesmanship." South African historian John Benyon defines a proconsul as a leader with "semi-independent and extraordinary capacity to shape the periphery" of an empire.

Modern writing on leadership tends to stress the distinction between "administration" on the one hand and "policy" on the other. This emphasis can be traced to an essay by Woodrow Wilson written in the late 19th century. In earlier epochs, it was common for leaders to combine the two roles. Since this is no longer the case, specific terminology is required to describe such officials.

In his classic study, Max Weber distinguished among three modes of legitimate governance: traditional, rational-legal, and charismatic. In the form of bureaucracy, the rational-legal mode is dominant in the modern world. But a modern proconsul may also resort to aristocratic, or charismatic, leadership.

In the Roman Republic, a proconsul was typically a former consul and thus an experienced commander-in-chief. Having held the Republic's highest office, he was a statesman as well as an administrator. Rome's patrician class was prepared to exercise aristocratic leadership, both civil and military.

Several factors are said to limit the scope of proconsular authority in modern times. Democracies put the military under civilian authority and tend to avoid policymaking by military leaders. Modern government emphasizes bureaucracy and rulemaking, while the Romans were aristocratic. Finally, modern communications allows for greater central control.

Although transoceanic telegraph lines were laid by the mid-19th century, Lord describes the late 19th century as the heyday of British proconsular authority. Lord Curzon in India, Frederick Lugard in Nigeria, Cecil Rhodes in South Africa, and Lord Cromer in Egypt all took imperial initiatives that London approved only reluctantly. As ruler of Japan and Korea after World War II, U.S. General Douglas MacArthur consciously modeled himself on a Roman aristocrat.
The role of U.S. General David Petraeus and others in Iraq suggests a continued need for proconsular leadership, according to Lord. Modern technology makes communication easier than ever. But as email and Power Point presentations proliferate, clarity and intellectual discipline is lost. Another factor is that civilian policymakers, whether on the spot or in the metropole, may lack the skills needed to manage military forces. Yet proconsuls are at best an ad hoc solution to a reoccurring problem. Managing a large territory in occupation or conflict requires a range of skills and the ability to deal with various organizations. No one is trained as a proconsul and the available administrators have experience in at most one relevant agency or service. During the Vietnam War, the U.S. attempted to deal with this issue by creating an integrated civilian-military command structure called Civil Operations and Revolutionary Development Support (CORDS).

British Empire

British colonial officials sometimes referred to as proconsuls include Alfred Milner in South Africa, Lord Curzon in India, Lord Lugard in Nigeria, and Lord Kitchener in Egypt and Sudan. These leaders were able to take imperial initiatives even when the government in London was reluctant. Conservative and Unionist governments were notably more tolerant of such freelancing than Liberal governments were. These proconsuls ruled in the age of the transoceanic telegraph, so rapid communication did not end proconsular independence.

United States
Various American commanders and ambassadors have been referred to as proconsuls. Writer Carnes Lord discusses the following figures in the framework of proconsular authority:
William Howard Taft in the Philippines (1900–1903)
Leonard Wood in Cuba
Lucius D. Clay in Germany
Douglas MacArthur in South Korea
Edward Lansdale, Henry Cabot Lodge Jr., Creighton Abrams, Ellsworth Bunker, and William Colby in South Vietnam
Wesley Clark in Bosnia in 1994–99
Paul Bremer in Iraq in 2003 
David Petraeus in Iraq in 2004–08 and Afghanistan in 2010–11

See also 
 Prorogatio, the legal process of extending a Roman command
 Notitia dignitatum
 Ambassadors and envoys from Russia to Poland (1763–1794)

References

Bibliography
 

Ancient Roman titles
Gubernatorial titles